Fritz Schramma is a German politician of the Christian Democratic Union (CDU).  He was mayor of Cologne from 2000 until 2009.

Career
In 2000, Schramma (CDU) assumed office as mayor-in-chief along with Bernhard Wimmer (CDU), because the incumbent Harry Blum (CDU) died unexpectedly. In a runoff vote, he won election on 17 September 2000 against Anke Brunn (Social Democrats), who was nominated by her party only a short time ahead of the vote. The Social Democrats were heavily weakened by corruption scandals. Schramma's term in office was nine years instead of the usual five: he first completed the term of his predecessor Blum until 2004, and then he served his own term as a result of winning the runoff in 2000.

References

External links
CityMayors.com article

Mayors of Cologne
Living people
Year of birth missing (living people)